The Shadow Ministry of Mark Latham was the opposition Australian Labor Party shadow ministry of Australia from December 2003 to January 2005, opposing John Howard's Coalition ministry.

Mark Latham became Leader of the Opposition upon his election as leader of the Australian Labor Party on 2 December 2003, and appointed his first Shadow Cabinet on 8 December. Latham's appointments made no distinction between the Shadow Cabinet and the Shadow Ministry.

December 2003 to October 2004
Leader of the Opposition – Mark Latham
Deputy Leader of the Opposition and Shadow Minister for Employment, Education and Training – Jenny Macklin
Leader of the Opposition in the Senate, Shadow Special Minister of State and Shadow Minister for Public Administration and Accountability – Senator John Faulkner
Deputy Leader of the Opposition in the Senate and Shadow Minister for Trade, Corporate Governance and Financial Services – Senator Stephen Conroy
Shadow Minister for Employment Services and Training – Anthony Albanese
Shadow Minister for Veterans’ Affairs and Shadow Minister for Customs – Senator Mark Bishop
Shadow Minister for Industry and Innovation and Shadow Minister for Science and Research – Senator Kim Carr
Shadow Minister for Children and Youth – Senator Jacinta Collins
Shadow Minister for Revenue and Shadow Assistant Treasurer – David Cox
Shadow Treasurer and Deputy Manager of Opposition Business – Simon Crean
Shadow Minister for Ageing and Seniors and Shadow Minister for Disabilities – Annette Ellis
Shadow Minister for Workplace Relations and Shadow Minister for the Public Service – Craig Emerson
Shadow Minister for Defence – Senator Chris Evans
Shadow Minister for Population, Citizenship and Multicultural Affairs – Laurie Ferguson
Shadow Minister for Urban and Regional Development and Shadow Minister for Transport and Infrastructure – Martin Ferguson
Shadow Minister for Mining, Energy and Forestry – Joel Fitzgibbon
Shadow Minister for Health and Manager of Opposition Business – Julia Gillard
Shadow Minister for Consumer Affairs and Shadow Minister Assisting the Shadow Minister for Health – Alan Griffin
Shadow Minister for Information Technology, Shadow Minister for Sport and Recreation and Shadow Minister for the Arts – Senator Kate Lundy
Shadow Minister for Homeland Security – Robert McClelland
Shadow Minister for Finance and Shadow Minister for Small Business – Bob McMullan
Shadow Minister for Housing, Urban Development and Local Government – Daryl Melham
Shadow Minister for Reconciliation and Indigenous Affairs and Shadow Minister for Tourism, Regional Services and Territories – Senator Kerry O'Brien
Shadow Minister for Agriculture and Fisheries – Gavan O'Connor
Shadow Attorney-General and Shadow Minister Assisting the Leader on the Status of Women – Nicola Roxon
Shadow Minister for Foreign Affairs and International Security – Kevin Rudd
Shadow Minister for Retirement Incomes and Savings – Senator Nick Sherry
Shadow Minister for Immigration – Stephen Smith
Shadow Minister for Family and Community Services – Wayne Swan
Shadow Minister for Communications and Shadow Minister for Community Relationships – Lindsay Tanner
Shadow Minister for Sustainability, the Environment and Heritage – Kelvin Thomson

Changes
On 12 July 2004, Kim Beazley rejoined the Labor front bench as Shadow Minister for Defence, replacing Chris Evans. The latter became Shadow Minister for Defence Procurement, Science and Personnel.

October 2004 to March 2005
Latham reshuffled the Shadow Cabinet on 26 October 2004.
Leader of the Opposition – Mark Latham
Deputy Leader of the Opposition and Shadow Minister for Education, Training, Science and Research – Jenny Macklin
Leader of the Opposition in the Senate and Shadow Minister for Social Security – Senator Chris Evans
Deputy Leader of the Opposition in the Senate and Shadow Minister for Communications and Information Technology – Senator Stephen Conroy
Shadow Treasurer – Wayne Swan
Shadow Minister for Finance and Superannuation – Senator Nick Sherry
Shadow Minister for Trade – Simon Crean
Shadow Minister for Health and Manager of Opposition Business in the House – Julia Gillard
Shadow Minister for Industry, Infrastructure and Industrial Relations – Stephen Smith
Shadow Minister for Foreign Affairs and International Security – Kevin Rudd
Shadow Minister for Defence and Homeland Security – Robert McClelland
Shadow Minister for Defence Planning and Personnel – Arch Bevis
Shadow Minister for Immigration – Laurie Ferguson
Shadow Minister for Public Administration and Open Government, Indigenous Affairs and Reconciliation, The Arts – Senator Kim Carr
Shadow Minister for Regional Development and Roads, Housing and Urban Development – Kelvin Thomson
Shadow Minister for Work, Family and Community, Youth and Early Childhood Education – Tanya Plibersek
Shadow Minister for Environment and Heritage, Deputy Manager of Opposition Business in the House – Anthony Albanese
Shadow Minister for Employment and Workplace Participation, Corporate Governance and Responsibility – Senator Penny Wong
Shadow Minister for Regional Services, Local Government and Territories – Senator Kerry O'Brien
Assistant Shadow Treasurer, Shadow Minister for Banking and Financial Services – Joel Fitzgibbon
Shadow Attorney-General – Nicola Roxon
Shadow Minister for Agriculture and Fisheries – Gavan O'Connor
Shadow Minister for Manufacturing, Consumer Affairs – Senator Kate Lundy
Shadow Minister for Sport and Recreation – Alan Griffin
Shadow Minister for Veterans' Affairs – Senator Mark Bishop
Shadow Minister for Small Business – Tony Burke
Shadow Minister for Ageing and Disabilities – Senator Jan McLucas
Shadow Minister for Justice and Customs, Citizenship and Multicultural Affairs, Manager of Opposition Business in the Senate – Senator Joseph Ludwig
Shadow Minister for the Pacific Islands – Bob Sercombe

Opposition of Australia
Latham